Colebatch may refer to:
 Colebatch, Shropshire, a village in England
 Colebatch, South Australia, a locality
 Hal Colebatch, former Premier of Western Australia
 his son Hal Gibson Pateshall Colebatch, Australian author and journalist
 Hundred of Colebatch, a cadastral unit in South Australia
 John Colebatch